Lyman Northrop Hine (June 22, 1888 – March 5, 1930) was an American bobsledder who competed in the late 1920s. Born in Brooklyn, New York, he won a silver medal in the five-man bobsleigh event at the 1928 Winter Olympics in St. Moritz.

References
Bobsleigh five-man Olympic medalists for 1928
DatabaseOlympics.com profile

1888 births
1930 deaths
American male bobsledders
Bobsledders at the 1928 Winter Olympics
Olympic silver medalists for the United States in bobsleigh
Medalists at the 1928 Winter Olympics